Nostima quinquenotata is a species of shore flies in the family Ephydridae.

Distribution
United States.

References

Ephydridae
Insects described in 1930
Diptera of North America
Taxa named by Ezra Townsend Cresson